Nursery Independent School District is a public school district based in the community of Nursery, Texas (USA).

The district has one school - Nursery Elementary - that serves students in grades kindergarten through five.

Middle and high school students attend the neighboring districts of Cuero and Victoria.

In 2009, the school district was rated "recognized" by the Texas Education Agency.

References

External links
 

School districts in Victoria County, Texas